Christopher Pravdica is an American musician and songwriter. He is best known as the bass guitarist of American experimental rock band Swans.

Biography
Pravdica is a member of the band Human Impact, along with former members of NYC based bands Cop Shoot Cop and Unsane. Ipecac Records released their first full length album in March of 2020.  He was a member of New York-based indie rock band The Gunga Din, which was founded in 1998. The band released two studio album, Introducing (1999) and Glitterati (2000). He also puts out solo music under the name We Owe. He performed with Flux Information Sciences on electronics, alongside fellow The Gunga Gin member Siobhan Duffy. After the break-up of Flux Information Sciences, Pravdica and former member Tristan Bechet founded the band Services, which released its debut album Your Desire Is My Business in 2005. In 2010, Pravdica joined Swans, which reunited that year. After the reunion, Swans released four studio albums with Pravdica: My Father Will Guide Me up a Rope to the Sky (2010), The Seer (2012), To Be Kind (2014) and The Glowing Man (2016).

Pravdica was once also a bartender.

Artistry and equipment
Pravdica's rhythmic bass playing for Swans is characterized for its simple grooves, which takes up an important role in the band's music. The minimalist grooves are exemplified on the track "A Little God in My Hands" from To Be Kind, with its 3 note bass line. His basslines are also noted for their "texture and loudness," which cut through the mix. Brice Ezell of PopMatters described bassline of the track “She Loves Us” (To Be Kind) as a "gut-punch of a bassline" while stating: "Pravdica sounds like he could lead an army in a triumphant battle march." Ezell also similarly categorized the basslines of the tracks "Oxygen" (To Be Kind) and "Jim" (My Father Will Guide Me up a Rope to the Sky) as "infectious" and "catchy," respectively.

For his live performances for Swans, Pravdica uses a Fender Precision Bass with a pick, accompanied mainly by a distortion pedal (Fulltone GT-500) and an Ampeg head and cabinet. He also occasionally performed on acoustic guitar and Jew's harp on Swans recordings.

Discography
We Owe
 Small Truth (2021)

With The Gunga Din
 Introducing (1999) 
 Glitterati (2000)

With Services
 Your Desire Is My Business (2005)

With Swans

 My Father Will Guide Me up a Rope to the Sky (2010)
 We Rose from Your Bed with the Sun in Our Head (2012)
 The Seer (2012)
 Not Here / Not Now (2013)
 To Be Kind (2014)
 The Gate (2015)
 The Glowing Man (2016)

Guest contributions
 The Vanity Set – The Vanity Set (2000) – fuzz bass, guitar, banjo, Jew's harp
 The Vanity Set / Sally Norvell – "Jump in the Grave"/"Exit Music (For a Film)" (2001) – guitar

References

External links
 Young God Records official website

American rock bass guitarists
American male bass guitarists
American rock songwriters
American male songwriters
Noise rock musicians
American experimental musicians
Swans (band) members
Year of birth missing (living people)
Alternative rock bass guitarists
Living people
Guitarists from New York City
American male guitarists
Human Impact members